The IFSC Climbing Asian Championships or Asian Sport Climbing Championships are annual Asian championships for competition climbing organized by the International Federation of Sport Climbing (IFSC). Until 2006, it was called UIAA Asian Championships. Then, from 2007 onwards it was called IFSC Asian Championships. In 2001, the first Bouldering Championship was held separately (from lead and speed competitions) from 19 to 20 December 2001 in Yung Ho, Taiwan. In 2018, at the Asian Championships in Kurayoshi, Japan, a combined format was introduced.

Championships

Men's results

Lead

Bouldering

Speed

Speed Relay

Combined

Women's results

Lead

Bouldering

Speed

Speed Relay

Combined

Medal summary (2000-2022)

References

External links 
 Calendar of IFSC competitions

Climbing competitions